Tinissa baliomicta is a moth of the family Tineidae. It was described by Edward Meyrick in 1928. It is found on the Philippines.

References

Moths described in 1928
Scardiinae